Shahsavan Kandi-ye Sofla (also Romanized as Shāhsavan Kandī-ye Soflá; also known as Shāh Savan Kandī and Shāhsavan Kandī-ye Mīānī) is a village in Shahsavan Kandi Rural District, in the Central District of Saveh County, Markazi Province, Iran. At the 2006 census, its population was 74, in 33 families.

References 

Populated places in Saveh County